Burying beetles or sexton beetles, genus Nicrophorus, are the best-known members of the family Silphidae (carrion beetles). Most of these beetles are black with red markings on the elytra (forewings). Burying beetles are true to their name—they bury the carcasses of small vertebrates such as birds and rodents as a food source for their larvae. They are unusual among insects in that both the male and female parents take care of the brood. They are carnivores.

The genus name is sometimes spelled Necrophorus in older texts: this was an unjustified emendation by Carl Peter Thunberg (1789) of Fabricius's original name, and is not valid under the ICZN.

The American burying beetle (Nicrophorus americanus) has been on the U.S. endangered species list since 1989.

Reproduction

Burying beetles have large club-like antennae equipped with chemoreceptors capable of detecting a dead animal from a long distance. After finding a carcass (most usually that of a small bird or a mouse), beetles fight amongst themselves (males fighting males, females fighting females) until the winning pair (usually the largest) remains. If a lone beetle finds a carcass, it can continue alone and await a partner. Single males attract mates by releasing a pheromone from the tip of their abdomens. Females can raise a brood alone, fertilizing her eggs using sperm stored from previous copulations. The carcass must be buried by the beetle(s) to get it out of the way of potential competitors, which are numerous.

The prospective parents begin to dig a hole below the carcass. While doing so, and after removing all hair from the carcass, the beetles cover the animal with antibacterial and antifungal oral and anal secretions, slowing the decay of the carcass and preventing the smell of rotting flesh from attracting competition. The carcass is formed into a ball and the fur or feathers stripped away and used to line and reinforce the crypt, where the carcass will remain until the flesh has been completely consumed. The burial process can take around 8 hours. Several pairs of beetles may cooperate to bury large carcasses and then raise their broods communally.

The female burying beetle lays eggs in the soil around the crypt. The larvae hatch after a few days and move into a pit in the carcass which the parents have created. Although the larvae are able to feed themselves, both parents also feed the larvae in response to begging: they digest the flesh and regurgitate liquid food for the larvae to feed on, a form of progressive provisioning. This probably speeds up larval development. It is also thought the parent beetles can produce secretions from head glands that have anti-microbial activity, inhibiting the growth of bacteria and fungi on the vertebrate corpse.

At an early stage, the parents may cull their young. This infanticide functions to match the number of larvae to the size of the carcass so that there is enough food to go around. If there are too many young, they will all be underfed and will develop less quickly, reducing their chances of surviving to adulthood. If there are too few young, the resulting adult beetles will be large but the parents could have produced more of them. The most successful beetle parents will achieve a good balance between the size of offspring and the number produced. This unusual method of brood size regulation might be the result of the eggs being laid before the female has been able to gauge the size of the carcass and hence how many larvae it can provision.

The adult beetles continue to protect the larvae, which take several days to mature. Many competitors make this task difficult, e.g. bluebottles and ants or burying beetles of either another or the same species. The final-stage larvae migrate into the soil and pupate, transforming from small white larvae to fully formed adult beetles.

Aside from eusocial species such as ants and honey bees, parental care is quite rare among insects, and burying beetles are remarkable exceptions.

Species

 there are over 60 valid, extant species in the genus Nicrophorus although a few undescribed species and synonyms remain to be worked up.

 Nicrophorus americanus – (American burying beetle)
 Nicrophorus antennatus
 Nicrophorus apo
 Nicrophorus argutor
 Nicrophorus basalis
 Nicrophorus carolina
 Nicrophorus charon
 Nicrophorus chilensis
 Nicrophorus concolor
 Nicrophorus confusus
 Nicrophorus dauricus
 Nicrophorus defodiens
 Nicrophorus didymus
 Nicrophorus distinctus
 Nicrophorus efferens 
 Nicrophorus encaustus
 Nicrophorus germanicus
 Nicrophorus guttula
 Nicrophorus heurni
 Nicrophorus hispaniola
 Nicrophorus humator
 Nicrophorus hybridus
 Nicrophorus insignis
 Nicrophorus insularis
 Nicrophorus interruptus
 Nicrophorus investigator
 Nicrophorus japonicus
 Nicrophorus kieticus
 Nicrophorus lunatus
 Nicrophorus maculifrons
 Nicrophorus marginatus
 Nicrophorus mexicanus
 Nicrophorus mongolicus
 Nicrophorus montivagus
 Nicrophorus morio
 Nicrophorus nepalensis
 Nicrophorus nigricornis
 Nicrophorus nigrita
 Nicrophorus oberthuri
 Nicrophorus obscurus
 Nicrophorus olidus
 Nicrophorus orbicollis
 Nicrophorus podagricus
 Nicrophorus przewalskii
 Nicrophorus pustulatus
 Nicrophorus quadraticollis
 Nicrophorus quadrimaculatus
 Nicrophorus quadripunctatus
 Nicrophorus reichardti
 Nicrophorus reticulatus
 Nicrophorus satanas
 Nicrophorus sausai
 Nicrophorus sayi
 Nicrophorus schawalleri
 Nicrophorus scrutator
 Nicrophorus semenowi
 Nicrophorus sepulchralis
 Nicrophorus sepultor
 Nicrophorus sinensis
 Nicrophorus smefarka
 Nicrophorus tenuipes
 Nicrophorus tomentosus
 Nicrophorus trumboi
 Nicrophorus ussuriensis
 Nicrophorus validus
 Nicrophorus vespillo
 Nicrophorus vespilloides
 Nicrophorus vestigator
 Nicrophorus chryseus (Mazokhin-Porshnyakov, 1953) – unverified
 Nicrophorus funerarius (Weigel, 1808) – unverified
 Nicrophorus laethius Sikes & Madge 2006 – unverified

Fossils
 †Nicrophorus pliozaenicus

A fossil of N. humator dating around 10,500 years was reported in 1962 by Pearson. An extinct unnamed member of the genus is known from the Late Cretaceous Cenomanian aged Burmese amber of Myanmar, around 99 million years old.

References

External links
Key to the British species of Nicrophorus

Nicrophorus Central
Sexual behavior of burying beetles, NYTimes, 2016

Silphidae
Staphyliniformia genera
Detritivores
Scavengers
Taxa named by Johan Christian Fabricius